The 1980 Lehigh Engineers football team was an American football team that represented Lehigh University as an independent during the 1980 NCAA Division I-AA football season. Lehigh went undefeated through the regular season and was the No. 1-ranked team in Division I-AA, but lost its national semifinal game.

In their fifth year under head coach John Whitehead, the Engineers compiled a 9–1–2 record (9–0–2 in the regular season). Mike Crowe and Mark Yeager were the team captains.

The Engineers' participation in the 1980 Division I-AA playoff marked their third year of postseason play in a four-year stretch, beginning with the NCAA Division II Football Championship in 1977, and continuing with their loss in the 1979 NCAA Division I-AA Football Championship Game.

Lehigh played its home games at Taylor Stadium on the university's main campus in Bethlehem, Pennsylvania.

Schedule

References

Lehigh
Lehigh Mountain Hawks football seasons
Lehigh Engineers football